Hidekichi Nagamatsu (August 4, 1914 – November 18, 1992) was a Japanese boxer who competed in the 1936 Summer Olympics.

In 1936 he was eliminated in the second round of the lightweight class after losing his fight to the upcoming silver medalist Nikolai Stepulov.

External links

1914 births
1992 deaths
Lightweight boxers
Olympic boxers of Japan
Boxers at the 1936 Summer Olympics
Japanese male boxers